A quartet is a musical group of four people or a piece written for four musicians

Quartet may also refer to:

Albums
 Quartet (Alison Brown album), 1996
 Quartet (Bill Frisell album), 1996
 Quartet (Herbie Hancock album), 1982
 Quartet (McCoy Tyner album), 2007
 Quartet (Pat Metheny album), 1996
 Quartet (Tony Rice and Peter Rowan album), 2007
 Quartet (Ultravox album), 1982
 Quartets (Boxhead Ensemble album), 2003
 Quartets (Fred Frith album), 1994

Film and television
 Quartet (1948 film), a British anthology film based on W. Somerset Maugham stories
 Quartet (1981 film), a Merchant Ivory film based on the Jean Rhys novel
 Quartet (2012 film), a British comedy-drama film based on the Ronald Harwood play
 Quartet (TV series), a 2017 Japanese drama series

Games
 Quartet (cards), a set of four cards of the same rank
 Quartets (card game), a card game released by many companies
 Quartet (video game), a 1986 video game by Sega

Literature
 Quartet (Harwood play), a 1999 play by Ronald Harwood
 Quartet (Müller play), a 1980 play by Heiner Müller
 Quartet (novel), a 1928 novel by Jean Rhys
 Quartet (short story collection), a 2001 book by George R.R. Martin

Other
 Quartet (computing), 4 bits in computing
 Quartet (sculpture), a 2008 public art work by Celine Farrell
 Quartet on the Middle East, or the Quartet, four entities involved in mediating the Israeli-Palestinian peace process
 Quartette (band), a Canadian country-folk vocal group

See also
 
 , equivalent word in German 
 , equivalent word in French 
 Four-piece musical ensemble
 Quarter (disambiguation)
 Tetralogy, a series of four literary or other works